Ramashish Rai is an Indian politician. He was National president of Bharatiya Janata Yuva Morcha (BJYM). He was elected to the Uttar Pradesh Legislative Council as a member of the Bharatiya Janata Party. He was very close with Lalkrishna Adavani, Rajnath Singh, Kalyan Singh. He associated with BJP in childhood and became a Mandal President of Bharatiya Janata Party.

He has worked with Narendra Modi in BJYM at the national level.

References

Living people
Members of the Uttar Pradesh Legislative Council
People from Deoria, Uttar Pradesh
Bharatiya Janata Party politicians from Uttar Pradesh
Year of birth missing (living people)

1993 Vidhansabha Election from Fazilnagar.

Nominated Member of Legislative council  in 1997 at Uttar Pradesh legislative assembly.